This is a list of chewing gum brands in the world. Chewing gum is a type of gum made for chewing, and dates back at least 5,000 years. Modern chewing gum was originally made of chicle, a natural latex. By the 1960s, chicle was replaced by butadiene-based synthetic rubber which is cheaper to manufacture. Most chewing gums are considered polymers.  This list contains both chewing gum and bubblegum.

Key:

0-9

A

B

C
Chappies.     South Africa

D

E

F

G

H

I

J

K

L

M

N

O

P

Q

R

S

T

U

V

W

X

Y

Z

See also
 Bubble gum
 Gum industry
 List of confectionery brands

References

 
Chewing gum